The Qatar National Library station is a station on the Doha Metro's Green Line in the Al Shagub district. It serves the municipality of Al Rayyan, specifically Al Shagub and other districts associated with Education City and Qatar Foundation. It is found on Al Luqta Street, beside the Qatar National Library.

The station currently has no metrolinks. Facilities on the premises include restrooms and a prayer room.

History
The station was opened to the public on 10 December, 2019 along with the other stations of the Green Line (also known as the Education Line).

Station Layout

References

Doha Metro stations
2019 establishments in Qatar
Railway stations opened in 2019